Cryptorhynchus is a genus of hidden snout weevils in the beetle family Curculionidae. There are at least 480 described species in Cryptorhynchus.

Gallery

See also
 List of Cryptorhynchus species

References

External links 
 
 
 

Cryptorhynchinae
Curculionidae genera
Taxa named by Johann Karl Wilhelm Illiger